Alessandro Pierini (born 22 March 1973) is an Italian retired footballer who played as a defender, and is the assistant manager of Trapani Calcio.

After playing for several clubs in his country, mainly Udinese, he finished his professional career in Spain, where he represented Racing de Santander and Córdoba.

Pierini won one cap for Italy, in 2001.

Playing career

Club
Born in Viareggio in the Province of Lucca, Tuscany, Pierini began his professional career with Udinese, making his debut in 1991 and moving on loan to Fidelis Andria four years later. He joined Fiorentina in 1999 for 14 billion lire (€7.23 million), and turned down a move to English side West Ham United in the summer of 2001 due to personal reasons, instead choosing to sign for Reggina after the bankruptcy of the Viola in 2002 and moving to Parma in January of the following year.

After a second spell with Udinese, Pierini moved to Spain at already 31, joining Racing de Santander. After only five La Liga matches he was released in the next transfer window and signed with Córdoba in Segunda División, being relegated in that season and promoting in his third, always as an undisputed starter.

International
Pierini made one appearance for the Italian national team, playing in the 1–2 friendly loss to Argentina at the Stadio Olimpico in Rome on 28 February 2001.

Coaching career
In July 2009, with Córdoba consolidated in the second level, Pierini retired from playing at the age of 36, but stayed connected with his last club, immediately being named its assistant manager. In summer 2012, after one year with the reserves, he had his first head coach experience away from the Estadio Nuevo Arcángel, being appointed at amateurs Ronda.

Pierini returned to his homeland subsequently, where he was in charge of Serie D teams Camaiore and Viareggio 2014. In February 2017, he was appointed at fellow league side Fezzanese.

Style of play
Pierini was a tough and physically strong defender, with a powerful build and good technical ability.

Personal life
Pierini's son, Nicholas, is also a professional footballer.

Honours
Fiorentina
Coppa Italia: 2000–01

References

External links

National team data 

1973 births
Living people
People from Viareggio
Italian footballers
Association football defenders
Serie A players
Serie B players
Udinese Calcio players
S.S. Fidelis Andria 1928 players
ACF Fiorentina players
Parma Calcio 1913 players
Reggina 1914 players
La Liga players
Segunda División players
Segunda División B players
Racing de Santander players
Córdoba CF players
Italy international footballers
Italian expatriate footballers
Expatriate footballers in Spain
Italian expatriate sportspeople in Spain
Italian football managers
Italian expatriate football managers
Expatriate football managers in Spain
Sportspeople from the Province of Lucca
Footballers from Tuscany
Córdoba CF B managers